There are over a dozen lakes named Mud Lake within the U.S. state of Indiana.

 Mud Lake, Fulton County, Indiana.		
 Pierceton Lake, also known as Mud Lake, Kosciusko County, Indiana.	
 Mud Lake, Kosciusko County, Indiana.	
 Nauvoo Lake, also known as Mud Lake, LaGrange County, Indiana.	
 Dollar Lake, also known as Mud Lake, LaGrange County, Indiana.	
 Mud Lake, LaGrange County, Indiana.		
 Mud Lake, Marshall County, Indiana.		
 Mud Lake, Noble County, Indiana.		
 Mud Lake, Noble County, Indiana.		
 Mud Lake, Noble County, Indiana.		
 Mud Lake, Porter County, Indiana.		
 Mud Lake, Porter County, Indiana.		
 Mud Lake, St. Joseph County, Indiana.	
 Mud Lake, St. Joseph County, Indiana.	
 Mud Lake, Steuben County, Indiana.		
 Mud Lake, Steuben County, Indiana.		
 Mud Lake, Steuben County, Indiana.		
 Brown Lake, also known as Mud Lake, Steuben County, Indiana.	
 Lone Hickory Lake, also known as Mud Lake, Steuben County, Indiana.	
 Mud Lake, Steuben County, Indiana.		
 Mud Lake, Wabash County, Indiana.		
 Mud Lake, Whitley County, Indiana.

References
 USGS-U.S. Board on Geographic Names